Go Hard may refer to:

 "Go Hard" (DJ Khaled song), 2008
 "Go Hard (La.La.La)", by Kreayshawn, 2012
 Go-Hard, a 1996 album by Junk Yard Band
 Go Hard, an EP by Boys Noize
 "Go Hard", a 2018 song by Olly Murs from You Know I Know